HMS Belleisle was a 74-gun third-rate ship of the line of the Royal Navy, launched on 26 April 1819 at Pembroke Dockyard.

Belleisle was converted to serve as a troopship in 1841 and sailed for China in Dec. 1841 for the First Opium War. She stayed in China until the Treaty of Nanking was signed in 1842. On 10 June 1856, she ran aground on the Englishman's Shoal, in the Bosphorus. She was refloated on 13 June.

Belleisle was subsequently used as a hospital ship at Chatham. In June 1866, she was lent by the Admiralty to the Seamen's Hospital Society for use as a hospitaly ship in London for seamen suffering from cholera. Whilst being towed up the River Thames by the tug Medusa, she ran aground, but was refloated on the next tide. Belleisle was broken up in 1872.

Notes

References

Lavery, Brian (2003) The Ship of the Line - Volume 1: The development of the battlefleet 1650-1850. Conway Maritime Press. .

External links
 

Ships of the line of the Royal Navy
Repulse-class ships of the line
Troop ships of the Royal Navy
Ships built in Pembroke Dock
1819 ships
Hospital ships of the Royal Navy
Crimean War naval ships of the United Kingdom
Maritime incidents in June 1856
Maritime incidents in June 1866